The Hill yield criterion developed by Rodney Hill, is one of several yield criteria for describing anisotropic plastic deformations.  The earliest version was a straightforward extension of the von Mises yield criterion and had a quadratic form.  This model was later generalized by allowing for an exponent m.  Variations of these criteria are in wide use for metals, polymers, and certain composites.

Quadratic Hill yield criterion 
The quadratic Hill yield criterion has the form

The quadratic Hill yield criterion depends only on the deviatoric stresses and is pressure independent. It predicts the same yield stress in tension and in compression.

Expressions for F, G, H, L, M, N 
If the axes of material anisotropy are assumed to be orthogonal, we can write

where  are the normal yield stresses with respect to the axes of anisotropy.  Therefore we have

Similarly, if  are the yield stresses in shear (with respect to the axes of anisotropy), we have

Quadratic Hill yield criterion for plane stress 
The quadratic Hill yield criterion for thin rolled plates (plane stress conditions) can be expressed as

For the special case of transverse isotropy we have  and we get

{| class="toccolours collapsible collapsed" width="80%" style="text-align:left"
!Derivation of Hill's criterion for plane stress
|-
| For the situation where the principal stresses are aligned with the directions of anisotropy we have

where  are the principal stresses.  If we assume an associated flow rule we have

This implies that

For plane stress , which gives

The R-value  is defined as the ratio of the in-plane and out-of-plane plastic strains under uniaxial stress .  The quantity  is the plastic strain ratio under uniaxial stress .  Therefore, we have

which in turn may be expressed as

This is of the same form as the required expression. Recall that,

We can use these to obtain

Solving for  gives us

Plugging back into the expressions for  leads to

which implies that

Therefore the plane stress form of the quadratic Hill yield criterion can be expressed as

|}

Generalized Hill yield criterion 
The generalized Hill yield criterion has the form

where  are the principal stresses (which are aligned with the directions of anisotropy),  is the yield stress, and F, G, H, L, M, N are constants.  The value of m is determined by the degree of anisotropy of the material and must be greater than 1 to ensure convexity of the yield surface.

Generalized Hill yield criterion for anisotropic material 

The R-value or Lankford coefficient can be determined by considering the situation where .  The R-value is then given by

Under plane stress conditions and with some assumptions, the generalized Hill criterion can take several forms.  
 Case 1: 

 Case 2: 

 Case 3: 

 Case 4: 

 Case 5: .  This is the Hosford yield criterion.

Hill 1993 yield criterion 
In 1993, Hill proposed another yield criterion  for plane stress problems with planar anisotropy.  The Hill93 criterion has the form

Extensions of Hill's yield criterion 
The original versions of Hill's yield criterion were designed for material that did not have pressure-dependent yield surfaces which are needed to model polymers and foams.

The Caddell–Raghava–Atkins yield criterion 
An extension that allows for pressure dependence is Caddell–Raghava–Atkins (CRA) model  which has the form

The Deshpande–Fleck–Ashby yield criterion 
Another pressure-dependent extension of Hill's quadratic yield criterion which has a form similar to the Bresler Pister yield criterion is the Deshpande, Fleck and Ashby (DFA) yield criterion  for honeycomb structures (used in sandwich composite construction).  This yield criterion has the form

References

External links 
 Yield criteria for aluminum

Plasticity (physics)
Solid mechanics
Yield criteria